Mohamed Ahmed Bashir, also known as Muhamed Besha, (born 22 July 1983) is a Sudanese footballer who plays for the Sudanese club Al-hilal Omdurman. He plays as a striker and also a winger. He is a member of the Sudan national football team. He was brought from Al-Mourada SC to Al-Hilal in December 2010. After having a good season with Al-Hilal in 2011, he was linked with Leyton Orient and Arsenal. He scored Sudan's first goal in 36 years in the 2012 African Cup Of Nations against Angola in the group B, which ended in a 2–2 . He was transferred to the Saudi club Al-Wehda in June 2012. He scored his first goal for Al-Wehda against Al-Ahli in a friendly match, which Al-Wehda won 0–4. Bisha later scored his first league competitive goal for his new side with a shot against the Saudi League champions Al-Shabab, but the team lost 2–5. He has been a fan favourite in Makkah and in Sudan as he scored his national team since playing his trade in Saudi Arabia against Ethiopia, which Sudan won 5–3 in a qualifier match for the 2013 AFCON held in South Africa.

Honours

Clubs
Al-Hilal Club
Sudan Premier League
Champion (5):2010, 2012, 2014, 2016, 2017
Sudan Cup
Winners (2):2011, 2016

International career

International goals
Scores and results list Sudan's goal tally first.

References

External links 
 

Living people
Sudanese footballers
Sudan international footballers
2012 Africa Cup of Nations players
1987 births
Al-Wehda Club (Mecca) players
Al-Hilal Club (Omdurman) players
Saudi Professional League players
Expatriate footballers in Saudi Arabia
People from Khartoum North
Association football midfielders
Sudanese expatriate sportspeople in Saudi Arabia
Sudanese expatriate footballers
Sudan A' international footballers
2011 African Nations Championship players
Association football coaches
2018 African Nations Championship players